Paul Blake (born 1949) is an English actor. He is most well-known for portraying Greedo in Star Wars. He also had minor roles in Some of My Best Friends Are... and Hennessy, as well as some roles in television series such as Down to Earth and Crossroads.He played many roles in theatres both in the UK and abroad; including the title role in Macbeth at Salisbury Playhouse,  Charles Swann in the Glasgow Citizen’s Theatre production A Waste of Time (based on Proust’s A La Recherche du Temps Perdu) amongst many others. 

Blake's friend Anthony Daniels recommended him when Lucasfilm was seeking actors for the cantina scene.

Personal life
Blake has 5 children with Kate, an actress, who initially trained at The Royal Ballet School; their youngest son , also called Paul, is a gold medal-winning Paralympic athlete who won the 400m T36 at the 2016 Rio Paralympics. They also have 7 grandchildren. Paul has a daughter, Lucy, from a previous marriage and 2 more granddaughters.

References

External links
 

Male actors from Birmingham, West Midlands
Year of birth missing (living people)
Living people
English male film actors
English male television actors